Cupriavidus oxalaticus is a genus of bacteria that includes the former genus Wautersia.

External links
Type strain of Cupriavidus oxalaticus at BacDive -  the Bacterial Diversity Metadatabase

Burkholderiaceae